is the pen name of a Japanese four-panel manga artist. She made her professional manga debut with Okusama Shinkaron in 1988. Her most famous work is OL Shinkaron. She won the 8th Tezuka Osamu Cultural Prize in 2004.

References

Women manga artists
Manga artists from Fukuoka Prefecture
Female comics writers
Japanese female comics artists
1957 births
Living people
Kansai University alumni
Winner of Tezuka Osamu Cultural Prize (Short Story Award)
20th-century Japanese women writers
20th-century Japanese writers